Rachael Crawford (born c. 1969 in Toronto, Ontario, Canada) is an actress best known for her roles in Brewster Place, Here and Now, and Show Me Yours, as well as guest appearances on various television series such as Cold Squad, Crossing Jordan, and more recently The Firm and Suits.

Filmography

Film

Television

References

External links

1969 births
Actresses from Toronto
Black Canadian actresses
Canadian film actresses
Canadian television actresses
Canadian voice actresses
Living people
Canadian people of Barbadian descent